The 10th Indian Cavalry Brigade was a cavalry brigade of the British Indian Army that formed part of the Indian Army during the First World War.  It remained in India throughout the war.

History
The Headquarters 10th Indian Cavalry Brigade was formed under 1st (Peshawar) Division in May 1917, presumably to command some of the units assigned to the 1st (Risalpur) Cavalry Brigade at this time.  In the event, only the 30th Lancers (Gordon's Horse) was assigned to the brigade, from December 1917 to July 1918.  The brigade remained with the division throughout the First World War.

Under mobilization plans drawn up in July 1918, IV Corps with 1st (Peshawar) Division under command would have included 1st and 10th Cavalry brigades with:
 4th Cavalry
 30th Lancers (Gordon's Horse)
 3rd Gwalior Lancers (I.S.)
 24th Machine Gun Squadron
 4th Field Troop, 3rd Bombay Sappers and Miners

Commander
The brigade was commanded from 10 May 1917 by Brigadier-General G.M. Baldwin.

See also

 10th Cavalry Brigade (British Indian Army) existed at the same time but was unrelated other than having the same number

Notes

References

Bibliography

External links

C10
Cavalry brigades of the British Indian Army
Military units and formations established in 1917